Ečstatica is a survival horror game for MS-DOS developed by British team Andrew Spencer Studios and released by Psygnosis in 1994. It was followed by a sequel, Ecstatica II, in 1997.

Gameplay
The gameplay is from a third-person perspective with viewing angles changing automatically. The player has the option of choosing either a male or female character. The player has the ability to sneak, walk or run in different directions. The character may carry two items—one item with each hand. Throughout the game, the character is under constant threat from demons. They must fight with the demons using various moves — this adds some elements of a fighting game. In addition to action and adventure elements, the game also contains moments of black and crude humor.

Plot
The setting is in Northern Europe in 928 AD. A traveler (the player) comes upon a town named Tirich hoping to find food and shelter. However, the town appears to be invaded by demons. The traveler must help the townspeople and lift the curse from the town by freeing the young sorceress Ečstatica from her possession.

Development
Initially developer Andrew Spencer Studios consisted of just Andrew Spencer himself, who spent years single-handedly creating the game engine used by Ecstatica. The team expanded to two people for the remainder of development: Spencer and film animation expert Alain Maindron.

The game uses a unique type of ellipsoid graphics to display characters. Each character is made of ellipsoids approximating different parts of the body. The environments, such as the trees and the shrubs, are also constructed in ellipsoids. This gave the game a unique aesthetic, as it looked much less angular than other more conventional polygon-based games at the time. Andrew Spencer explained, "The main advantage is the organic-looking characters. Triangles tend to make hard, robotic-looking figures, whereas ellipsoids can be used to create more rounded, human alternatives. Ellipsoids can also be more efficient because you can make a much better looking character out of fewer shapes."

Reception

Computer Gaming World nominated Ecstatica as its 1994 "Adventure of the Year", although it lost to Relentless: Twinsen's Adventure. The editors wrote of Ecstatica, "The offbeat characters and unusual storyline mesh with the racy humor to form an adventure of a different feather." In 1996, GamesMaster ranked the game 69th on their "Top 100 Games of All Time."

Reviews
White Wolf Inphobia #55 (May, 1995)

References

External links

1994 video games
Action-adventure games
DOS games
DOS-only games
1990s horror video games
Psygnosis games
Sony Interactive Entertainment franchises
Single-player video games
Video games featuring protagonists of selectable gender
Video games with pre-rendered 3D graphics
Video games about witchcraft
Video games developed in the United Kingdom